James Goold may refer to:
 James Alipius Goold (1812–1886), first Archbishop of Melbourne
 James Goold, Baron Goold (1923–1997), Scottish Conservative politician and accountant